Sharog is a village in Shimla district in the Indian state of Himachal Pradesh. It is a located near the town of Rohru and is about 125 kilometres (78 mi) away from Shimla and 8 km from Rohru. There is a temple of Devi Jaga Mata and the people of this village worship Dhonlu Devta, Shalonu Devta and Mahasu Maharaj. There is a temple of Dhonlu Devta. 
             
In the year 2021, village Sharog along with village Barara and village Palkan forms a new panchayat namely Sharog-Barara Gram panchayat.

Villages in Shimla district